Tyler John Lovell (born 23 May 1987) is an Australian field hockey player who plays as a goalkeeper for the Australian national team.

At the club level, he plays for YMCC in Melville Toyota League in Perth, Western Australia and Ranchi Rays in the Hockey India League. He made his debut for the national team at the 2013 Oceania Cup where they won the gold medal. He was part of Australia squad which won the 2014 World Cup. In December 2019, he was nominated for the FIH Goalkeeper of the Year Award.

References

External links
 
 
 
 
 

1987 births
Living people
Field hockey players from Perth, Western Australia
Male field hockey goalkeepers
Australian male field hockey players
Commonwealth Games medallists in field hockey
Commonwealth Games gold medallists for Australia
2014 Men's Hockey World Cup players
Field hockey players at the 2018 Commonwealth Games
2018 Men's Hockey World Cup players
Hockey India League players
Sportsmen from Western Australia
Medallists at the 2018 Commonwealth Games